The 2015 Big Ten Football Championship Game was a college football game that was played on December 5, 2015 at Lucas Oil Stadium in Indianapolis, Indiana. It was the fifth annual Big Ten Football Championship Game and it determined the 2015 champion of the Big Ten Conference. The game featured the Michigan State Spartans, champions of the East Division, and the Iowa Hawkeyes, champions of the West Division. Michigan State defeated Iowa 16–13 to win its second Big Ten Championship in three years. Since both teams were #5 and #4 respectively, the winner automatically clinch a berth to the four-team College Football Playoff.

History
The 2015 Championship Game was the fifth in the Big Ten's 120-year history, and the second to feature the conference's East and West division alignment. Iowa made its first appearance in the conference championship game, while Michigan State made its third appearance (L in 2011, W in 2013). To date, this game holds the Big Ten Football Championship Game attendance record.

Teams

Iowa

Iowa came into the Big Ten Championship Game with a 12–0 record and a #4 ranking in the College Football Playoff. The Hawkeyes were led by junior QB C.J. Beathard and 2015 Big Ten Defensive Back of the Year, junior CB Desmond King, who tied the school record and led the Big Ten with 8 INT.

The Hawkeyes sat atop the Big Ten West division standings wire-to-wire. They opened conference play with a hard-nosed 10-6 victory over the Wisconsin Badgers in Madison, and overwhelmed the Northwestern Wildcats 40-10 in Evanston two weeks later. Iowa clinched the Big Ten West division by defeating the Purdue Boilermakers 40-20 in the home finale at Kinnick Stadium, and completed an unbeaten regular season by defeating the Nebraska Cornhuskers 28-20 in Lincoln.

Head coach Kirk Ferentz was named Big Ten Coach of the Year for the fourth time after guiding Iowa to its first unbeaten regular season in 93 years.

Michigan State

Michigan State entered the Big Ten Championship Game with an 11–1 record and a #5 ranking in the College Football Playoff. On offense, the Spartans were led by Big Ten QB of the Year Connor Cook and Big Ten Receiver of the Year Aaron Burbridge. In the trenches, Jack Allen and Jack Conklin anchored the offensive line, while Shilique Calhoun and Malik McDowell led an imposing, stingy defensive unit.

The Spartans survived a dramatic regular season to capture the Big Ten East division title. On October 17, they scored on the final play of the game (a botched punt attempt) at rival Michigan to win 27-23. Three weeks later, Michigan State lost its only regular season game 39-38 at Nebraska. Then, in a de facto East division title game, the Spartans defeated defending National champion and No. 2 Ohio State in Columbus 17-14, as kicker Michael Geiger drilled a 41-yard field goal as time expired.

Game summary

Statistics

Aftermath
Michigan State, who had been ranked fifth in the College Football Playoff rankings heading into the game, jumped to third behind Alabama. Alabama beat then-No. 18 Florida 29–15 in the SEC Championship Game on the same day. As a result, Michigan State received a bid to the national semifinal against second-seeded Alabama in the Cotton Bowl Classic. Alabama defeated Michigan State 38–0 and later defeated No. 1 Clemson in the National Championship game. Iowa fell to fifth in the CFP rankings and received a bid to the Rose Bowl where they were defeated by Stanford 45–16.

See also
 List of Big Ten Conference football champions

References

Championship
Big Ten Football Championship Game
Iowa Hawkeyes football games
Michigan State Spartans football games
Big Ten Football Championship Game
Big Ten Football Champ
2010s in Indianapolis